Union, Progress and Democracy (UPyD ) was a Spanish political party founded in September 2007 and dissolved in December 2020. It was a social-liberal party that rejected any form of nationalism, especially the separatist Basque and Catalan movements. The party was deeply pro-European and wanted the European Union to adopt a federal system without overlap between the European, national and regional governments. It also wanted to replace the State of Autonomies with a much more centralist, albeit still politically decentralized, unitary system as well as substituting a more proportional election law for the current one.

UPyD first stood for election in the 9 March 2008 general election. It received 303,246 votes, or 1.2 percent of the national total, and one seat in the Congress of Deputies for party co-founder Rosa Díez, becoming the newest party with national representation in Spain. Although its core was in the Basque Autonomous Community, with roots in anti-ETA civic associations, it addressed a national audience. Prominent members of the party included philosopher Fernando Savater, party founder and former PSOE MEP Rosa Díez, philosopher Carlos Martínez Gorriarán and writer Álvaro Pombo.

At its Second Party Congress in November 2013, UPyD reported 6,165 registered members (down from an all-time high of 6,634 in 2011). In 2009 the party founded the think tank Fundación Progreso y Democracia (FPyD: Progress and Democracy Foundation), which has been presided over by UPyD spokesperson Rosa Díez.

In the general elections held on 20 November 2011, the party won 1,143,225 votes (4.70 percent), five seats which it was able to form a parliamentary group with in the Congress of Deputies (four in Madrid and one in Valencia) and became the fourth-largest political force in the country. It had the greatest increase of votes over the previous general election of any party. In the 2015 general election, however, it suffered a decline in its vote power by losing all of its seats. In the 2016 general election, it dropped to just 0.2% of the national vote.

On 18 November 2020, a judge ordered the dissolution of the party and its erasure from the registry of political parties, as it did not have the financial solvency to pay off the debt contracted with a former worker. The party announced that it would appeal the sentence. On 6 December 2020 it was announced that the party would no longer appeal the sentence, thus formally extinguishing UPyD.

Name
Mikel Buesa, at a 2007 party presentation, and Rosa Díez, in a 2007 interview for a magazine, explained the origin of the three concepts which make up the party's name:

Rosa Díez, Fernando Savater, Carlos Martínez Gorriarán and Juan Luis Fabo took charge of the choice of the party's name and the party's inscription into the Register of Political Parties. They opted for Union, Progress and Democracy, in the words of Rosa Díez, "because it was necessary a party that did the necessary democratic pedagogy and defended those three concepts unashamedly in Spain. Because, indeed, there is an urgent need for union between Spaniards, there is an urgent need for progressive policies and there is still a long way to go before achieving a quality democracy".

Origins

On 19 May 2007, 45 people met in San Sebastián to discuss the creation of a new political party opposing both major parties (the People's Party and the Spanish Socialist Workers' Party) at the national level. Most present were Basques, many of whom had long experience in political, union and civic organizations with left-wing, liberal and activist backgrounds. After the meeting, to create a broad-based social and political project they formed the Plataforma Pro organization. This united those who considered it necessary to form a new national political party appealing to people across the democratic political spectrum. Its platform was:
 The fight against ETA and politically motivated violence
 Regeneration of Spanish democracy
 Opposition to compulsory nationalism
 Reforming the Spanish Constitution of 1978 to reinforce civil liberties and equality, independent of regional origin

Among the supporters of Plataforma Pro were philosopher Fernando Savater, ¡Basta Ya! coordinator and spokesman Carlos Martínez Gorriarán and former Spanish Socialist Workers' Party (PSOE) MEP Rosa Díez. Díez resigned her PSOE membership and her MEP position in August 2007 to become involved with the UPyD project. Groups supporting Plataforma Pro included Citizens of Catalonia (notably Albert Boadella, Arcadi Espada and Xavier Pericay) and ¡Basta Ya!, a major influence on the new movement. In September 2007, Forum Ermua president Mikel Buesa announced their intention to participate in the political party arising from Plataforma Pro; he resigned in 2009 due to disagreements with Rosa Díez.

At a 29 September 2007 meeting in the auditorium of the Casa de Campo in Madrid, the new party was formed. Participants in its formation included Catalan dramatist Albert Boadella, Basque philosopher Fernando Savater, Peruvian writer Mario Vargas Llosa and Rosa Díez. Also present were journalist Arcadi Espada, anthropologists Teresa Giménez Barbat and Felix Perez Romera (three prominent Citizens of Catalonia members), historian Antonio Elorza, painter Agustín Ibarrola, former Forum Ermua leader Mikel Buesa, philosopher Carlos Martínez Gorriarán, Citizens deputies Albert Rivera and Antonio Robles Almeida, Peruvian writer Fernando Iwasaki, former UGT secretary general Nicolas Redondo and People's Party Basque MP Fernando Maura. Maura joined the new party's advisory council on 6 November 2007. Writer Álvaro Pombo later expressed support for UPyD, running as a candidate for the party.

Ideology

Official stance

Ideologically, UPyD wasn’t defined by itself as either left or right and its constituency included voters with an affinity for the political right as well as part of the Socialist Party's disenchanted voters. Likewise, the magenta party refused expressly to be placed in the political centre.  UPyD defined itself as "a progressive party which stood up for cross-sectionalism" when it was asked to be placed on the left–right political spectrum, thus supporting the ideas the party considered progressive from across the political spectrum. According to spokesperson Rosa Díez, the party was "progressive and cross-sectional: it had leftist people and right-wing, liberal people". Other additional identity signs were the following:
 "Constitutionalism", defining it as "the upholding of the Spanish state of law through the pursuance of the Spanish Constitution of 1978 in the regions in which is violated and non-nationalist citizens are discriminated against and, concurrently, through a modification of the Constitution’s instrumental articles to ensure that its non-negotiable ones—those that proclaim freedom, equality, cohesion, separation of powers and protection of all Spanish citizens under an independent justice—become effective".
 "Liberal democracy", defining it as "the form of government which best balances power and individual rights".
 "Monarchism", defining it as "the support for the monarchy of Spain insofar as it fulfils its function and is austere, transparent and exemplary".
 "Non-nationalism", defining it as "the opposition to compulsory nationalism". Rosa Díez denied that the magenta party identified with anti-nationalism, Spanish nationalism and postnationalism.
 "Partial centralism", defining it as "the political centralization of powers such as education, health, water resource management or transport management within a strong unitary state with other decentralized responsibilities in the autonomous communities". 
 "Pro-Europeanism", defining it as "the desire to move towards a real European federalism with the concept of citizenship as a fundamental pillar".
 "Radicalism, defining it as "the ambition on transforming politics by bringing off substantial, in-depth changes from within institutions".
 "Secularism", defining it as "the defence of state neutrality towards religious beliefs, with the exception of Islam and any other religion that isn't respectful of human rights and the Spanish legal system, and also towards the belief of those who don't embrace a faith".<ref name="secularism">{{cite journal|author=El Pueblo de Ceuta'''s editorial|date=30 September 2008|title=UPyD festeja su primer año como formación política en Madrid|url=https://www.elpueblodeceuta.es/200809/20080930/200809302101.html|access-date=30 April 2017|journal=El Pueblo de Ceuta|language=es|archive-url=https://web.archive.org/web/20151107105122/http://elpueblodeceuta.es/200809/20080930/200809302101.html|archive-date=7 November 2015|url-status=dead|quote=Laico porque "un Estado democrático tiene que ser laico, es decir, neutral ante todas las creencias religiosas respetuosas con los Derechos Humanos y con nuestro sistema jurídico, y también ante la creencia de los que no creen en religión alguna. El laicismo no es una postura antirreligiosa ni irreligiosa (hay laicistas muy creyentes) sino opuesta solamente a la manipulación teocrática de las instituciones públicas"}}</ref>
 "Social liberalism", defining it as "the support for a mixed economic system in which free-market economy features broad state intervention to correct its social inefficiencies, thereby making the welfare state compatible with individual liberty". Rosa Díez has specified that "social liberalism" was the political doctrine which UPyD was identified with because the party combines elements of "political liberalism" and "social democracy".
 "Spanish patriotism", defining it as "the defence of common values—justice, freedom and equality—and loyalty among fellow countrymen". Rosa Díez asserted that UPyD was "an unequivocally national party that had a unique agenda for Spain".

Outside sources
UPyD was assessed by the vast majority of political scientists and the media such as the European Social Survey, The Financial Times and The Economist as a centrist party, even though it was considered as centre-left by the political scientist Donatella Maria Viola and centre-right by the Encyclopædia Britannica. Also, the self-proclaimed cross-sectionalism of UPyD has been linked to radical centrism.

UPyD was a progressive party which combined social liberalism with centralism from the centre of the political spectrum. It's worth stressing that the centralist UPyD was the only statewide party that, until the appearance of Vox, actively defended the abolition of chartered regimes in all Spain, even in those regions which have them: Navarre and the Basque Country. Similarly, UPyD argued that the extreme political decentralization of the State of Autonomies has weakened the welfare state and created inequalities across the territory. Accordingly, UPyD wanted to adopt a symmetrical unitary system with broad political centralization in Spain.
 
UPyD defended the unity of Spain, thereby being an enemy of peripheral nationalism and the existence of several national identities within Spain. The magenta party advocated for the indissoluble unity of the Spanish nation so unconditionally that it supported the application of Article 155 of Spain's Constitution so as to suspend Catalonia's home rule, and the prosecution of Catalan separatist leaders for rebellion and sedition. Although UPyD was a progressive party strongly characterized by its rejection of peripheral nationalism, it also had objections to nation-state nationalism, including Spanish nationalism, because the party considered this kind of nationalism to be a threat to the progress of Europe's unity. UPyD was deeply pro-European and therefore supported a federal Europe, which the magenta party saw as an important guarantor of individual rights.

Criticism
Political scientist Ignacio Sánchez-Cuenca, professor of Sociology at the Complutense University of Madrid, postulated that UPyD aims to combat "Basque and Catalan nationalism with a good dose of Spanish nationalism but not with arguments". He reproached them to identify the State of Law, which is neutral in terms of territorial organization of power, with equal rights throughout the state. He also criticized its commitment to an electoral law that "prevents peripheral nationalist parties from having a significant presence in the Spanish Parliament" because, to his mind, fighting against nationalism with institutional reforms would mean "sacrificing the most essential elements of our democracy". Sánchez-Cuenca concluded by stating that "the ideology of UPyD seems clearly broken".

Although UPyD claims to be a social liberal party that rejects any form of nationalism, the party has been branded as a Spanish nationalist one, as well as by Ignacio Sánchez-Cuenca, by the journalist Javier Ortiz, by some writers such as Mónica Dorange, José Ramón Montero and Ignacio Lago and Jean-Pierre Cabestan and Aleksandar Pavković and by the scholarly association European Consortium for Political Research. This may be because UPyD has defended common positions with Spanish nationalism like the fact of denying the existence of differentiated nations in the state by stating that "the Spanish nation is the only nation that exists in Spain", the recovery by law of place names in Spanish of provinces, cities, municipalities and geographic features in the autonomous communities with co-official language, the amendment of the Spanish Constitution so that there isn't any distinction between nationalities and regions and Gibraltar's restitution to Spanish sovereignty.

Also, former president José Luis Rodríguez Zapatero criticized UPyD because, in his opinion, centralism has caused even more inequality than the current autonomic state and he pointed out that equality shouldn't be confused with uniformity. Rosa Díez replied that "neither centralism nor autonomy guarantees equality, which can only be ensured by redistributive laws".

The PP's member Ignacio González, despite admitting his agreement on issues such as the anti-terrorist policy and territorial integrity, has placed UPyD on the far-left of the political spectrum. Gotzone Mora, who requested the vote for the PP after belonging to the PSE-EE, said that UPyD's ideas are already defended by the PP and she accused UPyD of being a PSOE's submarine.

Policies
Fundamental proposals

Reform of the Spanish Constitution of 1978, focusing on three areas:
 Doing away with the Spanish autonomic state. UPyD wanted Spain to be a unitary state with stringent political decentralization, clearly defining in the Constitution which powers are exclusive of the State and which ones are transferable to autonomous communities or municipalities. The party wanted to centralize competences that concern citizens' fundamental rights like education, health, justice and fiscal policy among others because the State of Autonomies was considered to be "elephantine, politically unviable and economically unsustainable as well as creating nationwide inequalities". Another aspect of UPyD's territorial model was the abolition of Navarre's and the Basque Country's chartered regimes, establishing a common system of funding for all autonomous communities. Other noteworthy proposals were municipal mergers so that municipalities had a minimum dimension of 20,000 inhabitants, the suppression of the provincial councils (diputaciones provinciales), chartered councils (diputaciones forales), Basque General Assemblies (Juntas Generales vascas) and district councils (comarcas''), and the unicameralism of the Spanish General Courts after eliminating the Senate.
 Improvement and reinforcement of individual rights and obligations, strictly defined for all Spanish citizens without territorial, linguistic, ideological or religious inequalities. By advocating a unitary and centralizing concept of the Spanish nation, UPyD defended the unity of Spain as "a key instrument to ensure the equality of the whole of the Spanish citizenry".
 Deepening of the separation of powers, increasing judicial autonomy to ensure the independence of the Constitutional Court, the Court of Accounts and economic regulatory bodies from the executive.
By turning Spain into a secular state, the party supported a revision of existing agreements with the Holy See, the self-financing of the Catholic Church and other religious confessions and the total separation of church and state. Secularity for UPyD consisted in "ensuring fair treatment of all legitimate religious beliefs, that is, compatible with human rights, the state of law and democracy". UPyD put forward that "Islam isn't a legitimate religion because it imposes man's primacy over woman, because it doesn't even respect the possibility of being a nonbeliever and, above all, because of its rejection of the essence of the Universal Declaration of Human Rights, which is why it's got an own declaration of human rights justifying the existence of practices such as adulterous women's stoning and homosexuals' murder through sharia". Following this line of thought, the party supported the banning of Islamic headscarves (from burqa to hijab) in public spaces because they were considered to be "a way to subjugate women to men within Islam".
Reform of the Organic Act of the General Electoral Regime (LOREG) with 3 hopes: achieving voters' equality, regardless of residence; increasing the minority-party representation, underrepresented with today's electoral system compared to the majority-party one; and reducing regionalist and peripheral nationalist parties' representation. This reform raises biproportional apportionment of 350 seats in the Congress of Deputies. Of the 350 MPs, one would be elected from each province and one from each autonomous city for a total of 52 and the remaining 298 MPs would be elected by provinces, redeployed in proportion to the population, using the Sainte-Laguë method. But, the allocation of seats to parties would be based on the votes obtained in the 52 constituencies so that a party which has fewer votes than another can't receive more seats than that one. Firstly, the value of r-parameter, equivalent to 0.25% of the total valid votes, would be calculated. Secondly, r votes would be subtracted from those parties which have passed r votes, getting the reduced votes for each party; however, parties that hadn't reached r votes would be removed from the allocation of seats. Thirdly, using the D'Hondt method, 325 seats would be allocated proportionally to the reduced votes while the remaining 25 would be assigned according to the square of the reduced ones so as to achieve equity in parties' representation and compatible proportionality and governance. Finally, BAZI computer program, developed at the University of Augsburg, would be used to distribute the seats won by each party in the 52 constituencies.
Improvements in education, establishing a secular public education system in which scientific investigation is strengthened and language discrimination is eradicated. UPyD vituperates against compulsory language immersion in autonomous communities with more than one official language, thereby defending the freedom to choose the language in the enrolment of all nonlinguistic subjects and ensuring bilingualism by being the study of not only the Spanish language but also the regional language compulsory. The party opposes language discrimination in all public services.
Changes in the democratic system: eliminating the requirement of collecting 0.1 percent of constituencies' electorate for extra-parliamentary parties to run in the election, the enactment of an open-list panachage system, the direct election of mayors in a two-round system preventing post-election agreements misrepresenting the citizens' will, a limit of two successive full terms for executive public officeholders, banning the combination of two (or more) public offices and reducing former high officeholders' conflicts of interest. The party suggests making political parties' funding more transparent, increasing their independence from economic interests.
Measures to tackle terrorism that put emphasis on defeating ETA, closing its funding channels and blocking its political justification. Consequently, UPyD wants to toughen the law on parties in order to outlaw the political parties which form part of the EH Bildu coalition (Alternatiba, Aralar, Eusko Alkartasuna and Sortu) because they're considered to be ETA's political arm. The magenta party puts forward that these parties don't condemn ETA's terrorism and even justify ETA's killings, for example, calling ETA's imprisoned members "jailed politicians".
Advocacy of a free-market economy subject to necessary state interventions to eliminate tax evasion, provide quality public goods or services and increase equity in income distribution. Thus, the party proposed economic measures such as the reform of the wealth tax to convert it into a tax on large fortunes, raising the minimum exemptions so that people with average wealth weren't taxed and eliminating any mechanism that would have allowed tax avoidance.
Regarding immigration, UPyD wished to transfer immigration policy to the European Union as an exclusive competence. Therefore, the magenta party asked the European Commission for the inclusion of Ceuta and Melilla in the European customs area as full-fledged territories and, hence, the European Union's external borders. So, UPyD wanted Frontex to open delegations in both cities and bolster the Smart Borders Plan. The party supported the creation of a European green card allowing legal immigrants to have a joint residence and work permit in the European Union. UPyD stated that controlled immigration is good and necessary for Europe because of its demographic ageing and advocated a common immigration policy strictly respectful of international law and human rights that, as well as including the admission and stay criteria for immigrants according to the EU's employment needs as a whole, incorporated a European action protocol to keep illegal immigration at bay. On the one hand, the magenta party supported greater immigration control by arguing that the Ceuta and Melilla border fences had to be protected. UPyD believed that the Civil Guard should have stopped illegal immigrants and repatriate them legally or return them to the country which they entered from without violating their human rights, thereby rejecting pushbacks and banning the firing of rubber bullets and the use of razor wires as deterrents. On the other hand, the party stood up for giving asylum and humanitarian protection to displaced people outside their countries owing to armed conflicts and, consequently, defended applying dissuasive sanctions against EU member states which refused to accept refugees. Likewise, UPyD was favourable to earmark financial resources for promoting democracy in countries where there is no democracy and even to intervene militarily if financial resources are "insufficient for defending and protecting human rights and thus no one had to leave those countries". Finally, the magenta party thought that there shouldn't have been any discrimination in the acceptance of immigrants or refugees in Europe.
Environmental policy which makes technological and economic development compatible with environmental and biodiversity protection. Some measures are the following: nuclear power as the essential part of the energy mix that, together with renewable energy and hydraulic fracturing, Spain should have, the cessation of subsidies for coal mining and closure of cost-inefficient mining sites, the scientific research of climate change and its possible corrective measures, and a toughening of laws on the protection of natural areas by opposing the loss of coastline and sensitive natural areas due to urbanization and other misuses.
An abortion law decriminalizing induced abortion due to intimate reasons until a fourteen-week time period. Beyond that gestational limit, UPyD would have only allowed abortion in cases of the foetus's incompatibility with extrauterine life and risk of the mother's death "with the aim of reconciling the mother's right to a consenting maternity with the unborn's legal protection". To the party's mind, an embryo conceived by two people was a human being and, hence, abortion was always "a drama". That is why UPyD put forward that the regulation of abortion as a right, instead of its decriminalization under certain circumstances, isn't respectful of Article 15 of the Spanish Constitution, which applies to the unborn according to the Constitutional Court's jurisprudence. Therefore, the magenta party supported an early sex education within secondary education giving students information about all available contraceptive methods to prevent unwanted pregnancies and, simultaneously, fostering the notion that abortion had to be avoided as much as possible. Finally, UPyD opposed abortion access by minors without parental consent.

Other proposals
 In relation to bullfighting, UPyD supports bullfights as the national bullfighting festival and demands that the bullfighting regulation be an exclusive competence of the State to prevent bullfighting traditions from being suppressed by the autonomous communities. Nevertheless, UPyD is against giving grants-in-aid to bullfighting events either at the Spanish level (municipal, regional and state) or the European one, thereby asking the Spanish society to decide the future of bullfights with its attendance or non-attendance to the bullrings and disagreeing with the declaration of bullfighting as cultural heritage. Lastly, it's worth saying that UPyD is in favour of the abolition of the Toro de la Vega tournament and bull with fireballs.
 Creation of a political constitution for the European Union in which some powers like energy policy, fiscal policy, foreign policy, immigration or security and defence are transferred from the EU member countries to the European Parliament to build a federal Europe whose institutions have full legislative capacity and are under complete democratic control. Similarly, UPyD is in favour of the elimination of the intergovernmental European Council to promote the European Union's supranationality. In addition, the magenta party is committed to the abolition of the European Parliament's headquarters in Luxembourg and Strasbourg by concentrating all its parliamentary activity in a single headquarters in Brussels.
 Unconditional approval of concrete budgeting provisions for reinforcing the human and material resources of the Spanish security forces and intelligence services to fight against Islamic terrorism in good condition. Moreover, UPyD supports a military intervention in Syria within a European resolution under the protection of the United Nations in order to annihilate the Islamic State.
 Reform of Spanish Penal Code to impose revisable indefinite imprisonment for crimes of the utmost gravity, previously submitting this issue to a consultative referendum. Exemption from sentence or parole may be agreed when a minimum of 35 years have gone by if the prisoner gets a favourable, individualized prognosis of social reintegration in a penalty review process.
 Besides supporting same-sex marriage, the party favours adoption of children by same-sex couples because "the marginalization due to sexual orientation is absolutely reprehensible". UPyD puts forward that classical, traditional family isn't the only model of family and the child's right to have any sort of family must prevail.
 Regulation of surrogacy, laying down the full profit for the surrogate woman of an untaxed economic compensation borne by the surrogate parent or parents, whose quantity would have been agreed by both sides. A surrogacy agreement, irreversible for filiation purposes, might only have been entered into when the surrogate parent or parents would have exhausted or were incompatible with other assisted human reproduction techniques. The surrogate woman couldn't provide her own genetic material and, therefore, couldn't ever contest the child or children's sonship. The surrogate woman should have been over 18 years old, had a good psychophysical health and full capacity to act, had a healthy child before, had a stable socioeconomic situation and resided for the two previous years to the signing of the surrogacy agreement in Spain.
 Regulation of voluntary prostitution so that men and women can practice it with full legal security, with the necessary sanitary and hygiene guarantees and with the same rights and obligations as any worker. The regulatory framework for voluntary prostitution has to include the necessary measures for preventing this activity from causing conflicts in neighbourhoods and cities.
 Legalization of euthanasia. UPyD supports regulating passive and active euthanasia through a national public registry of living wills to close the door on people who want to dispose of one's life, either in medical field or familiar field. UPyD also favours assisted suicide, thereby ensuring terminally ill people the possibility of being helped to end their lives.
 By considering that cannabis isn't more dangerous for health than alcoholic beverages and tobacco, UPyD stands up for the decriminalization of production, trading and consumption of cannabis derivatives. However, the magenta party would keep the outlawing of the other illegal drugs.
 Attribution of the competence to assess compliance with the requirements for the qualification of a company as a SICAV to the Department of Financial and Tax Inspection of the Spanish Tax Agency by issuing a binding report to the National Securities Market Commission to prevent individuals and family groups, who fraudulently benefit from the tax privileges granted to SICAVs, from using SICAVs as an investment vehicle.

Funding
Shortly after the party's creation, on 13 December 2007, UPyD held a press conference headed by Rosa Díez, Mikel Buesa, and Fernando Savater at which it denounced "evidently unequal" treatment by Spanish banks, which denied the party loans while forgiving debts held by the other political parties. Although party activity was funded by membership fees and small donations, it "could not continue this way" or contest an election with such meager resources. Therefore, the party leadership decided to offer €200, €500 and €1,000 bonds to fund the party's campaign for the 2008 general elections. The bonds, totaling €3 million–€5 million, were sold at party offices, on the internet and over a toll-free phone line. The party pledged to report the amount of the loans obtained and the state of its accounts, and intended to repay the money after the elections with institutional funding for parties with parliamentary representation.

Elections

The party's national spokesperson, Rosa Díez, won a seat in the general election of 2008 from Madrid Province with 3.74 percent of the vote. Other prominent candidates were writer Álvaro Pombo (for the Senate) and Carlos Martínez Gorriarán, both of whom failed to win seats.

In 2009, the party gained representation in the European Parliamentary election and the Basque Regional Elections. Their MEP, Francisco Sosa Wagner, sat in the non-aligned group in the European parliament. In the Basque elections, Gorka Maneiro was elected to represent Álava.

In 2011, Luis de Velasco Rami and 7 other UPyD members were elected to the Madrid Assembly, with UPyD becoming the fourth-largest party. In the 2011 local elections, the party won seats in Madrid, Burgos, Ávila, Granada, Alicante and Murcia. UPyD received the fourth-largest number of votes in the 2011 general election: 1,143,225, or 4.70 percent. Of the five seats won, four (held by Rosa Díez, Carlos Martínez Gorriarán, Álvaro Anchuelo and Irene Lozano) were in Madrid; actor Toni Cantó was elected in Valencia Province.

In the 2014 European Parliament Elections, Francisco Sosa Wagner was re-elected, and UPyD won three extra seats (for Maite Pagazaurtundúa, Fernando Maura and Beatriz Becerra), consolidating their support nationwide. The party's MEPs planned to join the Alliance of Liberals and Democrats for Europe (ALDE) Group.

Criticism
In July 2009, party co-founder Mikel Buesa announced his resignation from UPyD, denouncing "authoritarian control" imposed by a group in the party. After its First Party Congress in November 2009, 100 UPyD critics (including four founding members) left the party, "tired and disappointed" with the "authoritarian" Rosa Díez and the party's "lack of internal democracy". By early 2010, the party lost 40 percent of its membership in Catalonia, amid allegations that the party was a fraud.

Electoral performance

Cortes Generales

Senate

European Parliament

Notes and references

Notes

References

Bibliography

External links

 Unión Progreso y Democracia – Official homepage (Spanish)

Political parties established in 2007
2007 establishments in Spain
Progressive parties
Social liberal parties
Radical parties
Centrist parties in Spain
Liberal parties in Spain
Monarchist parties in Spain
Pro-European political parties in Spain
Defunct political parties in Spain
Defunct liberal political parties
Political parties disestablished in 2020
2020 disestablishments in Spain